is a Japanese manga series written and illustrated by Tsubasa Fukuchi. It was serialized in Shogakukan's Weekly Shōnen Sunday from July 2014 to December 2018.

Plot 
The manga revolves around Saike Kuzushiro, a male middle school student without dreams or motivation. Within his normal everyday life, the only one who dotes on him is his female childhood friend, Mikan Karatachi. However, one day, after seeing Mikan in extreme danger, he gains psychic powers that surpass human knowledge.

Characters 

Saike is a junior high school student who gained magical powers after drowning in Mogura Pond. When he drowns in that pond, he has the power to rewind time all the way back to the beginning of a day. Initially a pessimist, nihilist and anti-social person, Saike decides to make more out of his life after saving Mikan.

Mikan is Saike's closest friend and crush. She is a third-year junior high school student who is a member of the art club. After dying by being hit by a truck, she was saved by Saike when he rewound time.

Eiji is Saike's loyal friend, and the first ability-user Saike encountered. He has the power to turn solid objects into Styrofoam.

Yumeo is the boss of the talented hunting group, Negative Rain, a group of special ability holders who erase the powers of people who use them for evil. He has the power to erase other peoples' abilities, but only if they agree with it.

Manga 
Psyche Matashitemo is written and illustrated by Tsubasa Fukuchi. It was serialized in Shogakukan's shōnen manga magazine Weekly Shōnen Sunday from July 9, 2014 to December 26, 2018. The series was collected into fifteen tankōbon volumes published by Shogakukan, from November 18, 2014 to February 18, 2019.

The manga was licensed in Indonesia by Elex Media Komputindo in 2016 as Saike's Repeated Days.

Volume list

Reception
The series placed 7th on the 2nd Next Manga Awards by Da Vinci magazine and Niconico in 2016.

References

External links
Official website at Web Sunday 
 

Shogakukan manga
Shōnen manga
Supernatural anime and manga